Savinov is a Russian masculine surname, its feminine counterpart is Savinova. It may refer to
Alexander Savinov (1881–1942), Russian painter and art educator
Alexei Savinov (born 1979), Moldovan football assistant manager and former player
Gleb Savinov (1915–2000), Russian painter, son of Alexander
Irina Savinova (born 1979), Uzbekistani archer
Mariya Savinova (born 1985), Russian middle-distance runner 

Russian-language surnames